SICAL is a Portuguese coffee brand company under the Nestlé portfolio since 1987.

Nestlé brands
Coffee industry